Gopegi (in Spanish Gopegui) is a village and council located in the municipality of Zigoitia, in Álava province, Basque Country, Spain. As of 2020, it has a population of 264.

Geography 
Gopegi is located 15km north-northwest of Vitoria-Gasteiz.

References

Populated places in Álava